Hanold is a  surname. Notable people with the surname include:

Marilyn Hanold (born 1938), American model and actress
Maylon Hanold (born 1963), American slalom canoeist
Terrance Hanold (1912–1996), American lawyer and food industry executive

See also
Harold (surname)